Xu Hun (fl. first half of ninth century) was a Chinese poet. He was poet in the Tang poetry tradition of the Tang Dynasty. By passing the rigorous requirements of the imperial examination system, he received his Jinshi degree, in 832, and subsequently followed a "moderately distinguished" professional scholarly career.  Xu Hun was descended from Xu Yushi, who was Chancellor under Emperor Gaozong of Tang.

Poetry
Two of Xu Hun's verses are included in the famous poetry anthology Three Hundred Tang Poems, both in the five-character regulated verse form. His work has been compared in style with Li Shangyin and Wen Tingyun.

See also
Classical Chinese poetry forms
Mind monkey
Regulated verse
Wakan rōeishū

Notes

References
 Davis, A. R. (Albert Richard), Editor and Introduction,(1970), The Penguin Book of Chinese Verse. (Baltimore: Penguin Books).

External links
 
Books of the Quan Tangshi that include collected poems of Xu Hun at the Chinese Text Project:
Book 528, Book 529, Book 530, Book 531,
Book 532, Book 533, Book 534, Book 535,
Book 536, Book 537, Book 538

9th-century Chinese poets
Poets from Jiangsu
Three Hundred Tang Poems poets
Writers from Zhenjiang